Podklanec is a settlement in the Municipality of Sodražica in southern Slovenia. The area was part of the Lower Carniola traditional region and is now included in the Southeast Slovenia Statistical Region.

References

External links
Podklanec on Geopedia

Populated places in the Municipality of Sodražica